Bang Khem station is a railway station located in Bang Khem Subdistrict, Khao Yoi District, Phetchaburi Province. The station is named after the nearest village, Ban Bang Khem, in Phetchaburi Province.

Services 
 Ordinary 251/252 Bang Sue Junction-Prachuap Khiri Khan-Bang Sue Junction
 Ordinary 254/255 Lang Suan-Thon Buri-Lang Suan

References 
 
 

Railway stations in Thailand
Samut Songkhram province